Marcel Alix Jean Marchessou (24 June 1879 – 6 April 1964) was a French colonial administrator, spending over 30 years in Africa.

Biography
Marchessou became the first Mayor of Bangui in 1912. He served as Acting Governor-General of French Equatorial Africa in 1927, before becoming Acting Governor of Moyen-Congo in December 1929, remaining in post for just over a year. He was Acting Governor-General of French Equatorial Africa again in September–October 1934, and again between March 1935 and April 1936. He was also briefly head of Dahomey in 1934.

In December 1936 he moved to New Caledonia to start a two-year term as Governor of New Caledonia, Commissioner General in the Pacific and High Commissioner to the New Hebrides. During his time in the Pacific he gained the nickname "Marche dessous" (walk underneath) due to his height of only 5'. After finishing his term, he returned to France.

Following World War II he was excluded from the Legion of Honour for his alleged role in court-martialing members of the French resistance in Riom during the Vichy regime.

References

People from Haute-Loire
French colonial governors and administrators
Mayors of Bangui
Governors of French Equatorial Africa
Governors of New Caledonia
Recipients of the Legion of Honour
1879 births
1964 deaths